In traditional Japanese aesthetics,  is a world view centered on the acceptance of transience and imperfection. The aesthetic is sometimes described as one of appreciating beauty that is "imperfect, impermanent, and incomplete" in nature. It is prevalent in many forms of Japanese art.

Characteristics of  aesthetics and principles include asymmetry, roughness, simplicity, economy, austerity, modesty, intimacy, and the appreciation of both natural objects and the forces of nature. It is often discussed in tandem with a similar aesthetic concept, .

Description
According to Leonard Koren,  can be described as "the most conspicuous and characteristic feature of what we think of as traditional Japanese beauty. It occupies roughly the same position in the Japanese pantheon of aesthetic values as do the Greek ideals of beauty and perfection in the West." For Richard Powell, " nurtures all that is authentic by acknowledging three simple realities: nothing lasts, nothing is finished, and nothing is perfect."

The words  and  do not translate directly into English;  originally referred to the loneliness of living in nature, remote from society;  meant "chill", "lean" or "withered". Around the 14th century, these meanings began to change, taking on more positive connotations.

After centuries of incorporating artistic and Buddhist influences from China,  eventually evolved into a distinctly Japanese ideal. In art books, it is typically defined as "flawed beauty".  artworks often emphasize the process of making the piece and that is ultimately incomplete.

From an engineering or design point of view,  may be interpreted as the imperfect quality of any object, due to inevitable limitations in design and construction/manufacture especially with respect to unpredictable or changing usage conditions; in this instance,  could be interpreted as the aspect of imperfect reliability, or the limited mortality of any object, hence the phonological and etymological connection with the Japanese word .

 and  both suggest sentiments of desolation and solitude. In the Mahayana Buddhist view of the universe, these may be viewed as positive characteristics, representing liberation from a material world and transcendence to a simpler life. Mahayana philosophy itself, however, warns that genuine understanding cannot be achieved through words or language, so accepting  on nonverbal terms may be the most appropriate approach.

In one sense  is a training whereby the student of  learns to find the most basic, natural objects interesting, fascinating and beautiful. Fading autumn leaves would be an example.  can change the student's perception of the world to the extent that a chip or crack in a vase makes it more interesting and gives the object greater meditative value. Similarly materials that age such as bare wood, paper and fabric become more interesting as they exhibit changes that can be observed over time.

The  and  concepts are religious in origin, but actual usage of the words in Japanese is often quite casual because of the syncretic nature of Japanese belief.

In Japanese arts
Many forms of Japanese art have been influenced by Zen and Mahayana philosophy over the past thousand years, with the concepts of the acceptance and contemplation of imperfection, and constant flux and impermanence of all things being particularly important to Japanese arts and culture. 

Examples include:

  (the traditional  (bamboo flute) music of wandering Zen monks)
  (the art of flower arrangement)
 The cultivation of bonsai (miniature trees) – a typical bonsai design features wood with a rough texture, pieces of deadwood, and trees with hollow trunks, all intended to highlight the passage of time and nature. Bonsai are often displayed in the autumn or after they have shed leaves for the winter, in order to admire their bare branches.
 Traditional Japanese gardens, such as Zen gardens (tray gardens) 
 Japanese poetry
 Japanese pottery, such as Hagi ware, Raku ware and 
 Tea ceremony, by means of an analogous study of action and environment.  pursues this self-consciously

A contemporary Japanese exploration of the concept of  can be found in the influential essay In Praise of Shadows by Jun'ichirō Tanizaki.

Western use
 has been employed in the Western world in a variety of contexts, including in the arts, technology, media, and mental health, among others.

The arts
Many Western designers, writers, poets and artists have utilised  ideals within their work to varying degrees, with some considering the concept a key component of their art, and others using it only minimally.

According to Penelope Green, Koren's book subsequently "became a talking point for a wasteful culture intent on penitence and a touchstone for designers of all stripes."

 concepts historically had extreme importance in the development of Western studio pottery; Bernard Leach (1887–1979) was deeply influenced by Japanese aesthetics and techniques, which is evident in his foundational book A Potter's Book.

Some haiku in English also adopt the  aesthetic in written style, creating spare, minimalist poems that evoke loneliness and transience, such as Nick Virgilio's "autumn twilight:/ the wreath on the door/ lifts in the wind".

Technology
During the 1990s, the concept was borrowed by computer software developers and employed in agile programming and Wiki, used to describe acceptance of the ongoing imperfection of computer programming produced through these methods.

Media
On 16 March 2009, Marcel Theroux presented "In Search of Wabi Sabi" on BBC Four, as part of the channel's Hidden Japan season of programming, travelling throughout Japan trying to understand the aesthetic tastes of its people. Theroux began by comically enacting a challenge from the book Living  by Taro Gold, asking members of the public on a street in Tokyo to describe  – the results of which showed that, just as Gold predicted, "they will likely give you a polite shrug and explain that Wabi Sabi is simply unexplainable."

Mental health
Wabi-sabi has been evoked in a mental health context as a helpful concept for reducing perfectionist thinking.

See also
 Clinamen
 Higashiyama Bunka in the Muromachi period
  (a Japanese aesthetic ideal)
 
 
 Teaism
 
  (also known as )
 Tao Te Ching
 I Ching
 Perfect is the enemy of good

References

Bibliography
 
 Davies, Roger and Osamu Ikeno (Eds.) (2002). The Japanese Mind. Tuttle Publishing. pp. 223-231. .

External links
 In Search of Wabi Sabi with Marcel Theroux

Chadō
Concepts in aesthetics
Design
Japanese aesthetics
Japanese literary terminology
Japanese style of gardening
Japanese words and phrases
Landscape design history
Low-energy building
Sustainable building
Words and phrases with no direct English translation